House of Louie was a Chinese restaurant in Portland, Oregon's Old Town Chinatown neighborhood, in the United States. The restaurant was managed by James Leung, as of 2006, and closed in 2018 after operating for 30 years.

See also

 List of Chinese restaurants
 List of defunct restaurants of the United States
 History of Chinese Americans in Portland, Oregon

References

External links
 
 

2018 disestablishments in Oregon
Defunct Chinese restaurants in Portland, Oregon
Northwest Portland, Oregon
Old Town Chinatown
Restaurants disestablished in 2018